Оksana Anatolyevna Dorodnova ((born 14 April 1974 in Moscow) is a Russian rower who competed for the Russia in the four Summer Olympics.

In 2000, she was a crew member of the Russia boat which won the bronze medal in the quadruple sculls event.

External links
profile

1974 births
Living people
Russian female rowers
Olympic rowers of Russia
Rowers at the 1996 Summer Olympics
Rowers at the 2000 Summer Olympics
Rowers at the 2004 Summer Olympics
Rowers at the 2008 Summer Olympics
Olympic bronze medalists for Russia
Rowers from Moscow
Olympic medalists in rowing
Medalists at the 2000 Summer Olympics
World Rowing Championships medalists for Russia